The MacDonald Brothers is the self-titled debut album by Scottish duo The MacDonald Brothers. It was recorded in 2007 and released on 2 April 2007. It entered the UK Albums Chart at number 18 with first week sales of 11,596.

Background
The band's self-titled debut album was released on 2 April 2007, around five months after the band had finished fourth place on the UK TV talent show, The X Factor, with Leona Lewis finishing as the show's winner. The album was recorded from January 2007 until it was released in April 2007 under Simon Cowell's Syco Records and Sony Music Entertainment.

The album was recorded from approximately January until March 2007, and was released on April 2, 2007. The album was released through Syco Records along with Sony BMG.

Critical reception
Commenting on in March 2007, HMV said: After their success on the X Factor, the MacDonald Brothers release their debut eponymous album, a collection of feel good classic and Scottish/Celtic pop, along with two self-penned numbers. The album was produced by former Bay City Rollers star Stuart "Woody" Woods.

Track listing
"500 Miles"
"Shang-A-Lang"
"Love Is All Around"
"Young at Heart"
"When You Say Nothing at All"
"Real Gone Kid"
"Magic"
"Bye Bye Baby"
"Fields of Gold"
"Perfect"
"Love Is Blind"
"Now It's Time"
"With a Woman Like You"

Chart performance
 UK Albums Chart – #18
 Scottish Albums Chart – #1

References

2007 albums
The MacDonald Brothers albums